The National Animal Disease Information Service (NADIS) is a British veterinary organisation that limits the spread of animal diseases; it is partly government-funded.

History
NADIS was formed in 1995 to look at disease prevention in cattle, sheep and pigs.

Function
Each month it publishes a Parasite Forecast for British farmers.

Structure
It is headquartered in west Wales.

Funding
Organisations that fund NADIS include Quality Meat Scotland (QMS) and AHDB Beef and Lamb (former EBLEX)

References

External links
 NADIS

Agricultural organisations based in the United Kingdom
Animal disease control
Cattle in the United Kingdom
Medical and health organisations based in the United Kingdom
Organisations based in Wales
Scientific organizations established in 1995
Veterinary medicine in the United Kingdom
Veterinary organizations